The Closer Settlement Acts (NSW) were introduced by the New South Wales parliament between 1901 and 1909 to reform land holdings and in particular to break the squatters' domination of land tenure.

The Acts included the Closer Settlement Acts of 1901 and 1904, and the Closer Settlement (Amendment) Acts of 1906 and 1907

See also 
Nineteen Counties

References
Australian Bureau of Statistics. 1910. Early History of Land Tenure

1901 in Australian law
1904 in Australian law
1906 in Australian law
1907 in Australian law
1900s in New South Wales
History of New South Wales
New South Wales legislation
Agriculture in New South Wales